Best Entertainment Television (BETV) is a local private television channel in Bujumbura, the largest city and former capital city of Burundi.

History

BE TV (since 2017) 
BETV is an apolitical private television channel in Burundi, launched on October 5, 2017. Its mission is to promote Burundian culture by promoting cultural agents and the talents of the country in its broadcasts in Kirundi, French and Swahili and English.

BE TV Burundi stands for Best Entertainment Television. It's different from and has no partnership with the Belgian cable television platform BeTV (formerly Canal+ Belgique), launched on 29 August 2004, when the former platform Vivendi sold Canal+ Benelux. It is also involved in entertainment activities throughout the country. In 2019, it was the exclusive media that covered the event of the Buja Music Awards at its first edition on July 7, 2019. The same goes for the event of Buja Fashion Week the same year.

On May 20, 2019, BETV launched its website and app on Google PayStore.

Logo

Programmes 

BE News
Top 10
BE TV Sport
Sante pour tous
Abakundana
Ikinicogihe
Weekend Show
BE QUIZZ
BE Dance
ProjectZ
Emission PPF SHOW
BUSINESS SHOW
 
 
 
 
Abakundan

Notable presenters and journalists 
 Spoks Man

See also
Burundi National Radio and Television
Canal+
StarTimes

References

External links

 BE TV Burundi on YouTube

Publicly funded broadcasters
Cable television companies
Television in Burundi
Broadcasting companies of Burundi
French-language television networks
Television channels and stations established in 2015
Mass media companies established in 2015